Varga is a Filipino comics superhero created by Mars Ravelo. He wrote and illustrated Varga for Bulaklak Magazine, appearing first in the magazine's No. 17, Vol. 4 (July 23, 1947) issue. A falling out with some of the magazine's editors caused Ravelo to resign from Bulaklak and transfer to Pilipino Komiks (Ace Publications), where he re-launched his superhero. Ravelo renamed her Darna, an anagram of the superhero's mortal alter-ego name Narda. Darna's adventures in Pilipino Komiks began in the No. 77 (May 13, 1950) issue, where she was illustrated by Nestor Redondo.

Not to be confused with the similarly-named Edwin Samonte character, Varga: The Amazing Iron Lady, which first appeared in Super Action Komiks No. 191, April 11, 1989.

Origin
It can also be noted that Varga was a character archived twice. Varga first began as a superhero concept before World War II, in late 1939. "VARGA" made her debut in Bulaklak Magazine, Vol. 4, No. 17 on July 23, 1947, which Mars wrote and drew himself. It was under the name "DARNA" the character became famous.

In an interview, Ravelo revealed that he offered his creation first to Liwayway Magazine and then to other publications, but was rejected several times.

The concept and image of Varga, the first female superhero in the Philippines, was based on the illustrations of Superman appearing on comic books brought by soldiers from the United States to the Philippines. It was the story of a mortal girl named Narda (named after one of Ravelo's childhood playmates), her brother Ding and their grandmother, Lola Asay. They lived in the town of Masambong when a falling star revealed itself to be a magic amulet that turns the little girl named Narda into the superhero Varga.

For more than six decades the character Varga was lost, until she resurfaced as a rebooted character in the 2008 Komiks Presents: Varga TV series.

Costume
The original Varga is not to be confused with the Varga character featured in the 2008 TV series. The original Varga appears like Darna except her costume featured long sleeves and a fitted shirt that featured the sun and three stars from the Philippine flag. She wore shorts and a simple belt with a loincloth (bahag) in the middle like Darna before letting go of the long sleeve form fitting shirt featuring the stars and sun and replaced it with the familiar bra while only retaining 2 of the 3 stars.

In the 2008 TV series, Varga wore a purple romper, cape and boots with gold detail, golden headpiece with "V" insignia, and golden medallion belt. She sports braided pigtails.

In other media
In Komiks Presents: Varga, a 2008 television series starring Mariel Rodriguez, Varga was an alien named Princess Varona from the planet Vargon.  On Earth, Varga is assisted by a human girl named Olga in secretly protecting mankind and saving the world from “the forces of evil”.

Planet Vargon is home to a race of powerful beings from outer space. Due to the destruction of her home planet, Vara escapes and landed on Earth, however, only existing in a ghost form. The Princess meets a young human girl name Olga, who is the only one who can see her, due to her kind heart. Under Olga's influence, Vara falls in love with the people of Earth.

These two women's destiny are meant to be merged literally. Upon a shout and a touch, the violet-colored ghost Vara unites with the human child Olga, fused into one person in a single body: the superhero Varga. Together, Vara and Olga begin their journey to become a real hero, and to defeat earth's enemy, Xandra - an evil woman who preys on the youth and beauty of others to stay young and beautiful.

Collected editions

See also

Darna
Captain Barbell
Isang Lakas
Siopawman
Ipo-ipo
Lagim
Voltar
List of Filipino superheroes

References

1947 comics debuts
Comics about women
Comics characters introduced in 1947
Female characters in comics
Fictional Filipino people
Filipino comics characters
Filipino superheroes
Philippine comic strips